The Benz Victoria was a car sold by the Benz motor company from 1893 to 1900. When bought in Sweden 1900 it cost, in today's value, about 30.000 Euro/Dollars.

See also
List of Mercedes-Benz vehicles
Benz Velo

References

Benz vehicles
1890s cars
Vehicles introduced in 1893